Dowr Ab (also Romanized as Dowr Āb) is a village in Mehravan Rural District, in the Central District of Neka County, Mazandaran Province, Iran. At the 2006 census, its population was 410, in 91 families.

References 

Populated places in Neka County